Alejandro Hernández may refer to:

 Alejandro Hernández (director) (born 1990), Venezuelan filmmaker
 Alejandro Hernández (footballer) (born 1948), Mexican footballer
 Alejandro Hernández (screenwriter) (born 1970), Cuban screenwriter based in Spain
 Alejandro Hernández (tennis) (born 1977), Mexican tennis player
 Alejandro Hernández Hernández (born 1982), Spanish football referee
 Alejandro Hernandez, sentenced to death and later exonerated; see Jeanine Nicarico murder case
 Alejandro Hernandez (ice hockey) (born 1991) Spanish ice hockey player for CD Hielo Bipolo
 Alejandro Cruz Hernández (born 1986), Spanish footballer
 Alejandro Martínez Hernández (born 1962), Mexican politician

See also
 Alejandro Fernández, Mexican singer